Harald Hammarström (born 1977 in Västerås, Sweden) is a Swedish linguist. He is currently an Associate Senior Lecturer at Uppsala University. Hammarström is especially known for his extensive work on curating Glottolog, a bibliographic database of the world's languages.

Hammarström has previously been employed as a researcher at the Max Planck Institute for the Science of Human History in Jena, Germany and at the Max Planck Institute for Psycholinguistics, in Nijmegen, Netherlands.

His wide-ranging research interests include the historical linguistics and linguistic typology of South America, Africa, and Melanesia.

Selected works
Handbook of Descriptive Language Knowledge: A Full-Scale Reference Guide for Typologists (2007)
Unsupervised Learning of Morphology and the Languages of the World (2009)
Linguistic Diversity and Language Evolution (2016)
Language Isolates in the New Guinea region (2017)
A Survey of African Languages (2018)
An inventory of Bantu languages (2019)

References

External links
Homepage of Harald Hammarström
Academia.edu
ResearchGate

1977 births
Living people
Linguists from Sweden
Linguists of Papuan languages
Linguists of indigenous languages of the Americas
Linguists of Bantu languages
Academic staff of Uppsala University
Chalmers University of Technology alumni
Max Planck Institute for the Science of Human History
Computational linguistics researchers
People from Västerås